This is a list of media related to the Duke Nukem series of video games. Duke Nukem was originally created by Apogee Software. This list contains all officially released, scheduled, and canceled Duke Nukem media, as well as some fan-made games.

Video games

Main series 
 Duke Nukem (1991)
 Duke Nukem II (1993)
 Duke Nukem 3D (1996)

 Plutonium PAK/Atomic Edition (1996)
 20th Anniversary World Tour (2016)

 Duke Nukem Forever (2011)

Spin-offs and related titles 
 Duke Nukem (Game Boy Color) (1999)
 Duke Nukem: Manhattan Project (2002)
 Duke Nukem: Time to Kill (1998)
 Duke Nukem: Land of the Babes (2000)
 Duke Nukem: Zero Hour (1999)
 Duke Nukem Advance (2002)
 Duke Nukem Mobile (2004)
 Duke Nukem Mobile (3D) (2004)
 Duke Nukem Mobile: Bikini Project (2005)
 Duke Nukem Arena (2007)
 Duke Nukem: Critical Mass (2011)

Canceled games 
 Duke Nukem Forever (sidescroller) 
 Duke Nukem: Endangered Species (later released in 2006 as Vivisector: Beast Within)
 Duke Nukem D-Day (alternatively titled Duke Nukem: Man of Valor)
 Duke Nukem: Mass Destruction (later released in 2016 as Bombshell)
 Duke Nukem: Chain Reaction
 Duke Nukem: Proving Grounds

Other games featuring the character Duke Nukem 
 Cosmo's Cosmic Adventure (1992)
 Death Rally (1996)
 Balls of Steel (1997)
 Bulletstorm (2011)

Duke Nukem 3D related titles

Expansions 
 Duke Assault (1997)
 Duke Caribbean: Life's a Beach (1997)
 Duke it out in D.C. (1997)
 Duke: Nuclear Winter (1997)
 Duke Xtreme (1997)
 Duke!ZONE (1996)
 Duke!ZONE II (1997)

Ports 
 Duke Nukem 3D (Game.com) (1997)
 Duke Nukem 3D (iPhone/iPod Touch) (2009)
 Duke Nukem 3D (Nokia N900) (2009)
 Duke Nukem 3D (Xbox Live Arcade) (2008)
 Duke Nukem 3D (Mega Drive) (1998)
 Duke Nukem 3D (Sega Saturn) (1997)
 Duke Nukem 64 (Nintendo 64) (1997)
 Duke Nukem: Total Meltdown (PlayStation) (1997)

Fan-made 
 Duke Nukem 3D: Reloaded (reimagining of Duke Nukem 3D)

Soundtracks 
 Duke Nukem: Music to Score By (1999)

Comics 
A comic series titled Duke Nukem: Glorious Bastard by IDW Publishing was released on July 20, 2011. IDW had previously created a 22-page comic book for the Duke Nukem Forever Balls of Steel Edition.

Film

In January 2018, John Cena was in talks with Paramount Pictures and Platinum Dunes to star in a Duke Nukem film franchise.

Notes

References

External links 
 Official Duke Nukem website
 Official Duke Nukem II website
 Official Duke Nukem 3D: Atomic Edition website
 Official Duke Nukem Forever website
 Duke Nukem 3D: Reloaded website

Soundtracks 
 Review of Music to Score By

Duke Nukem
Duke Nukem